Pickpockets is a 2018 Colombian crime-drama film directed by Peter Webber and written by Alejandro Fadel and Martín Mauregui. The plot revolves around how a master in the art of pickpocketing teaches aspiring teen thieves about what it takes to be successful pickpockets on the streets of Bogota.

Cast 
 Carlos Bardem as Chucho
 Carlos Humberto Camacho as El hombre de negro
 Ulises Gonzalez as Jaime
 Marcela Mar as Fresh's mother
 Matthew Moreno as Jhoncito
 Julio Pachón as Rico
 Emiliano Pernía as Fresh
 Dubán Andrés Prado as Doggy
 Carlos Quintero as Alex
 Natalia Reyes as Juana
 Noëlle Schönwald as Tia Hilda
 Sigifredo Vega as Falsificador
 David Velasquez as Maicol

Release
It was released on April 12, 2018 on Netflix streaming.

References

External links 
 
 
 

2018 films
2018 crime drama films
Colombian crime drama films
Spanish-language Netflix original films
2010s Spanish-language films
Films directed by Peter Webber
2010s Colombian films
Films set in Bogotá
Films scored by Alex Heffes